Events in the year 1319 in Norway.

Incumbents
Monarch: Haakon V Magnusson then Magnus VII Eriksson

Events
8 May – House of Sverre dies out and is replaced by the House of Bjelbo as the ruling house of Norway.
8 July – Three-year-old Magnus Eriksson is elected king of Sweden, thus establishing a union with Norway. His mother Ingeborg of Norway is given a place in the regency, in both Sweden and Norway.

Arts and literature

Births

Deaths
8 May - Haakon V of Norway, king (born 1270).
Agnes Haakonsdatter, illegitimate daughter of King Haakon V of Norway (born 1290).

References

Norway